Brico Dépôt is a chain of DIY and home improvement stores, headquartered in Longpont-sur-Orge. The chain was created in 1993 by Castorama Dubois Investment and later purchased by the British group Kingfisher which operates 135 stores in Belgium, 123 in France, 34 in Romania, 28 in Spain and 3 in Portugal.

Brico Dépôt has a low-cost warehouse format which sells a limited line of around 10,000 products in large quantities. In Romania it dropped warehouse format in 2016.

In 2014, the first 15 stores opened in Romania after the acquisition of the Bricostore chain by Kingfisher, followed by the acquisition of Praktiker Romania in 2018, bringing the number of stores to 34.

Brico Dépôt brand is used, since 2006, by Kingfisher's Castorama in Poland for 2 stores, other 4 stores were rebranded and 1 closed.

See also

Kingfisher plc
Castorama

References

External links
Brico Dépôt France 
Brico Dépôt Portugal
Brico Dépôt Romania
Brico Dépôt Spain

Retail companies established in 1993
Hardware stores
Kingfisher plc
Retail companies of France
Retail companies of Romania